Cattleya harrisoniana ("Harrison's Cattley's orchid") is a bifoliate Cattleya species of orchid.  The diploid chromosome number of C. harrisoniana has been determined as 2n = 40.  The haploid chromosome number of C. harrisoniana has been determined as n = 20.

References

A comparison between C. harrisoniana and C. loddigesii

External links

harrisoniana
Bifoliate Cattleya